Bradley Kahlefeldt (born 27 July 1979) is an Australian triathlete born in Temora, NSW. Kahlefeldt has lived in the city of Wagga Wagga since 1982. Brad now splits his time between the Gold Coast and France during the European summer. He won the gold medal in the 2006 Commonwealth Games Triathlon. Brad has three World Championship Bronze Medals (2005, 2007, 2010) twice while it was called the World Championship and once while it was called the World Championship Series (see ITU World Triathlon Series for details) and also competed in the 2008 Beijing Olympic Games and 2012 London Olympic Games.

Kahlefedlt was chosen as the 2008 Australia Day Ambassador for his home city of Wagga Wagga. He is an Australian Institute of Sport scholarship holder.

References

External links

 Brad Kahlefeldt page at Wagga Wagga Triants website
 Brad Kahlefeldt's own website

1979 births
Living people
Australian male triathletes
Commonwealth Games gold medallists for Australia
Sportspeople from Wagga Wagga
Australian people of German descent
Triathletes at the 2008 Summer Olympics
Triathletes at the 2012 Summer Olympics
Olympic triathletes of Australia
Triathletes at the 2006 Commonwealth Games
Australian Institute of Sport triathletes
Commonwealth Games medallists in triathlon
20th-century Australian people
21st-century Australian people
Sportsmen from New South Wales
Medallists at the 2006 Commonwealth Games